Acutigebia danai is a mud shrimp of the family Upogebiidae, endemic to the coastal waters of New Zealand and the Kermadec Islands.

Distribution
It has been recorded from the Bay of Islands, Stewart Island, the Kaikoura Peninsula, Cook Strait, Hauraki Gulf, Opoulu, Kaipara Harbour, the Kermadec Islands.

Taxonomy
Adam White had described Upogebia hirtifrons in 1847 from an Antarctic expedition, and when James Dwight Dana examined material from Bay of Islands, New Zealand, he assigned them to White's species. However, Edward J. Miers realised that the two were different species, and described the New Zealand species as Gebia danai, commemorating Dana in the specific epithet. Both species are now known to occur in New Zealand.

References

Thalassinidea
Marine crustaceans of New Zealand
Crustaceans described in 1876
Taxa named by Edward J. Miers